John Clifford Otto (1948–2020) was an American politician and CPA accountant who served as a member of the Texas House of Representatives for District 18, which consists of Liberty, San Jacinto, and Walker counties from 2005 to 2017. Otto did not seek reelection in 2016 and retired in early 2017. Otto died in 2020 at the age of 71 due to pancreatic cancer complications.

References

External links 

 State legislative page 

Otto, John
Otto, John
Texas A&M University alumni
People from Liberty County, Texas
1948 births
2020 deaths